The year 1997 in archaeology involved some significant events.

Excavations
 The exhumation of Yagan's head.
 Major salvage excavation of Neolithic-era Ashkelon begun by Yosef Garfinkel of the Hebrew University of Jerusalem (continues to 1998).
 Excavation at Jericho by Lorenzo Nigro and Nicolò Marchetti.
 Excavation of cargo of Vietnamese porcelain in the South China Sea off Hội An (Vietnam), directed by Mensun Bound, begins.

Publications
 Barry Cunliffe – The Ancient Celts (Oxford University Press)
 Sarah Milledge Nelson (ed.) – The Archaeology of Northeast China: Beyond the Great Wall (London: Routledge).
 Sarah Milledge Nelson – Gender in Archaeology: Analyzing Power and Prestige (Walnut Creek: AltaMira Press).
 Bernard Sergent – Genèse de l'Inde (Paris: Payot).
 R. E. Witt – Isis in the Ancient World (Baltimore: Johns Hopkins University Press).

Finds
 March: Pioneer Helmet found in a warrior grave at Wollaston, Northamptonshire, England.
 April: Roman coin hoard found at Patching, West Sussex, England.
 Herto Man, remains of a 160,000- to 154,000-year-old human, discovered in Ethiopia.
 Recovery of Homo skeletal remains at least 350,000 years old from the Sima de los Huesos (Pit of Bones) at the archaeological site of Atapuerca in northern Spain begins.
 Megalosaurus and Cetiosaurus footprints are identified at Ardley, Oxfordshire, by Christopher Jackson.
 Scauri shipwreck of c.400–450 is found off Pantelleria.

Events
 July 10: In London, scientists report their DNA analysis findings from a Neandertal skeleton which support the out of Africa theory of human evolution placing an "African Eve" at 100,000 to 200,000 years ago.
 July 19: Emergency designation of the 18th century wreck of the Hanover off the coast of Cornwall under the Protection of Wrecks Act 1973.
 September: Portable Antiquities Scheme begins in England as a pilot voluntary scheme for the recording of small finds of base metal or non-metallic archaeological artefacts found by metal detectorists or other members of the public.
 Bryn Euryn, an archaeological site near Colwyn Bay, is identified as the probable base of Cynlas Goch, a 6th-century Welsh king.
 Experimental archaeology: Construction of Guédelon Castle in France using 13th century techniques begins.

Births

Deaths
 May 17 - James Bennett Griffin, American archaeologist (b. 1905).
 June 30 - Su Bingqi, Chinese archaeologist (b. 1909)
 November 13 - Elisabeth Munksgaard, Danish historian and archaeologist (b. 1924).
 November 6 - Anne Stine Ingstad, Norwegian archaeologist (b. 1918).
 October 4 - Anne Strachan Robertson, Scottish archaeologist and numismatist (b. 1910)

References

Archaeology
Archaeology
Archaeology by year